Sigrid Grabner (née Hauf; born 29 October 1942) is a German writer.

Biography
Sigrid Grabner was born in the town of Tetschen-Bodenbach, Czech Republic. After the expulsion of the Sudeten Germans, her family moved to Merseburg, Germany in 1947 where Grabner attended school until 1957. In 1961 she graduated from high school in Halle and worked in agriculture for one year. From 1962 to 1967 she studied cultural studies and Indonesian studies at the Humboldt University in East Berlin. In 1972, she received her doctorate there with a thesis on the Indonesian cultural policy during the Sukarno dictatorship. Since 1974 Grabner has worked as a freelance writer. The Stasi spied on Grabner, as she became suspicious of being a CIA agent.

In the 1990s, she co-founded and led the Brandenburgische Literaturbüro. She was married to writer and concentration camp survivor Hasso Grabner and has two children. Today Grabner lives in Potsdam.

Writing
Grabner has published a large number of non-fiction books, Essays, biographies and historical novels. Her biographical works on historical persons include biographies of Mahatma Gandhi, Cola di Rienzo, Christina of Sweden and Gregory the Great. Several times she traveled the original locations for her research.

Together with Hendrik Röder she published books about Emmi Bonhoeffer, Henning von Tresckow and the Nazi opponent Hermann Maaß. She is a regular contributor to Vatican Magazin.

In 2003, Sigrid Grabner published her autobiography Jahrgang '42 – mein Leben zwischen den Zeiten (Year '42 – My life between the times). The second volume Im Zwielicht der Freiheit – Potsdam ist mehr als Sanssouci (In the twilight of freedom – Potsdam is more than Sanssouci) followed in 2019.

Accolades
 1992: Guest of honour, Villa Massimo
 2000: Scholar, Künstlerhaus Schloss Wiepersdorf

Selected works
as writer:
 Was geschah auf der "Zeven Provinciën"?, Berlin 1980
 Traum von Rom, Berlin 1985
 Mahatma Gandhi – Politiker, Pilger u. Prophet, Berlin 1987
 Christine – Rebellin auf Schwedens Thron, Frankfurt, Berlin 1995
 Jahrgang ’42 – mein Leben zwischen den Zeiten, Leipzig 2003
 Im Auge des Sturms – Gregor der Große, Augsburg 2009
 Sie machte Frieden – Maria Theresia und andere Erzählungen, Kisslegg 2018
 Im Zwielicht der Freiheit – Potsdam ist mehr als Sanssouci, Kisslegg 2019

as editor:
 1000 Jahre Potsdam, Frankfurt, Berlin 1992
 Potsdam 1945–1989 – zwischen Anpassung und Aufbegehren, Potsdam 1999
 Im Geist bleibe ich bei Euch – Texte und Dokumente zu Hermann Maaß, Berlin 2003
 Henning von Tresckow, ich bin, der ich war, Berlin 2005
 Emmi Bonhoeffer – bewegende Zeugnisse eines mutigen Lebens, Reinbek 2006

References

20th-century German non-fiction writers
21st-century German non-fiction writers
German-language writers
1942 births
German biographers
German women biographers
German autobiographers
Women autobiographers
Living people
German women non-fiction writers
20th-century German women writers
21st-century German women writers
People from Děčín
People from Sudetenland
Sudeten German people